Diboko Airport  is an airstrip serving Diboko, a village in Kasaï Province, Democratic Republic of the Congo.

See also

 Transport in the Democratic Republic of the Congo
 List of airports in the Democratic Republic of the Congo

References

External links
 OpenStreetMap - Diboko Airport
 OurAirports - Diboko Airport
 FallingRain - Diboko Airport
 HERE Maps - Diboko Airport
 

Airports in Kasaï Province